Gardner may refer to:

Name
Gardner (given name)
Gardner (surname)

Places

United States
Gardner, Colorado
Gardner, Illinois
Gardner, Kansas 
Gardner, Massachusetts
Gardner, North Dakota
Gardner, Tennessee
Gardner, Wisconsin
Glen Gardner, New Jersey

Geographical features
Gardner (crater) on the Moon
Gardner Canal in British Columbia, Canada
Gardner Inlet in Antarctica
Gardner Pinnacles in Hawaii, United States
Gardner River in Yellowstone National Park, United States
Gardner Island or Nikumaroro, part of the Phoenix Islands, Kiribati

Institutions
Gardner–Webb University in North Carolina
Isabella Stewart Gardner Museum in Boston, Massachusetts
L. Gardner and Sons Ltd., Patricroft, Manchester, England - a builder of diesel engines
Gardner (automobile), a car maker based in St. Louis, Missouri, between 1920 and 1931

Animals
Gardner snake, any species of North American snake within the genus Thamnophis, more properly called garter snakes

Weapons
Gardner gun, an early machine gun

Medicine
Gardner's syndrome

See also 
 Gardener
 Gardiner (disambiguation)
 Justice Gardner (disambiguation)